Qendër Piskovë is a former municipality in the Gjirokastër County, southern Albania. At the 2015 local government reform it became a subdivision of the municipality Përmet. The population at the 2011 census was 1,742. The municipal unit consists of the villages Piskovë, Bual, Kosinë, Rapckë, Mokricë-Zleushë, Kutal, Kosovë, Hotovë, Odriçan, Raban, Alipostivan, Borockë, Gosnisht, Pagri, Pacomit, Grabovë and Argovë.

References

Former municipalities in Gjirokastër County
Administrative units of Përmet